The following is a list of films produced in Hong Kong in 1960:.

1960

References

External links
IMDB list of Hong Kong films
Hong Kong films of 1960 at HKcinemamagic.com

1960
Hong Kong
1960 in Hong Kong